Problepsis ochripicta is a moth of the family Geometridae first described by William Warren in 1901. It is found in Sierra Leone and on the islands São Tomé and Annobón.

References

Moths described in 1901
Scopulini
Moths of Africa
Insects of West Africa
Moths of São Tomé and Príncipe
Fauna of Annobón